This is a list of all discovered caves in Gibraltar.

Underwater
Caves form above sea level, and the reason for some caves being located below sea level is that for much of the last 100 thousand years, sea level has been lower than its present level, by up to 120m. This means that the caves which are now underwater may at one time have been lived in by people. These caves are the subject of research projects.

Caves above sea level 
The caves within the Rock of Gibraltar have been used as shelter during sieges and attacks on the islands for hundreds of years. The caves have also been used to store water and ammunition on a routine basis and historically Neanderthals lived in a number of the caves.

There are thought to be over 200 caves in Gibraltar. These are the caves that are above ground:

* Abbot's Cave (Cueva de los Abades)
 Alameda Grotto
 Ape's Den Cave
 Beefsteak Cave
 Bell's Backyard Cave
 Bellman's Cave
 Bennett's Cave
 Blackstrap Cave
 Boathoist Cave (Bulman's Cave)
 Bray's Cave
 Brown's Cave
 Buena Vista Cave
 Buffadero Cave
 Caleta Palace Cave
 Camp Bay Cave (Parson's Lodge)
 Catalan Bay Road Cave
 Catalan Bay Cave
 Catchment Cave
 Cave S
 Collin's Cave
 Comcen Cave
 Coptic Cave
 Cormorant Cave
 Cousin's Cave
 Crystal Cave
 Crystal Cavern
 Cumberland Cave
 Dead Man's Cave
 Devil's Dustbin
 Devil's Fall
 Devil's Fall (North)
 Devil's Fall (West-Upper) (Crack Cave)
 Devil's Fall (West-Lower)
 Devil's Gap Cave
 Devil's Tower Cave (Mousterian Shelter)
 Dickson's Cavee
 Diesel's Delight
 Douglas Cave
 Dudley Ward's Cave
 East Queen's Line Cave
 Europa Advance Cave
 Europa Pass Cave
 Fig Tree Cave
 Fig Tree Cave 2
 Forbes' Quarry Cave
 Genista Caves
 Genista Cave 1
 Genista Cave 2
 Genista Cave 3
 Genista Cave 4
 George's Bottom Cave
 Gibbon's Cave
 Glen Rocky Cave
 Glen Rocky Shelter Cave
 Goat's Hair Twin Caves
 Goat's Head Cave
 Gorham's Cave
 Gunn's Cave
 Harley Street Fissure
 Hayne's Cave
 Holy Boy's Cave
 Horseshoe Cave
 Ince's Cave
 John's Giant Cave
 Judge's Cave
 Landport Cave (Leary's Cave)
 Leonora's Cave
 Levant Cave
 Liddell's Union Fissure
 Lookout Cave (Hole in the Wall)
 Mammoth Cave (Signal Station Cave)
 Marble Arch Cave
 Martin's Cave
 Martin's Guard Cave 1 & 2
 McNeil's Cave
 Mediterranean Cave
 Middle Hill Cave
 Monkey's Cave
 Moorish Castle Barracks Cave
 Moor's Cave (Cueva del Moro)
 Mount Misery Fissure
 Mousterian Rock Shelter
 Mushroom Cave
 "Nameless" Cave
 Nursery Cave
 O'Hara's Cave
 "Operation Monkey" Cave
 Painter's Cave
 Parson's Lodge Cave
 Pete's Paradise Cave
 Poca Roca Cave
 Queen's Cave
 Queen's Lines Cave
 Queen's Road Caves
 Ragged Staff Cave
 Reservoir Cave No. 4
 Reservoir Cave No. 5
 Reservoir Fissure
 Rifle Dustbin
 Rock Fall Cave
 Rock Gun Cave
 Rock Gun Catchment Shelter
 Ronald's Delight
 St. Michael's Cave, Old
 St. Michael's Cave, New
 St. Michael's Cave, Lower Lower
 St. Michael's Cave, Roof Passage
 Sandy Cave Lower
 Sandy Cave Upper
 Sapper's Bog Scorpion Cave
 Sea Caves
 Shed Cave
 Signal Troop Cave
 Smart's Well Reserve
 Smith's Cave
 Smuggler's Cave
 South Cave
 Spanish Mine
 Spider Cave
 Spur Road Cave
 Star Chamber Cave
 Swallow's Nest Cave
 Tina's Fissure
 Transmitter Fissure Treasure Cave
 Upper All's Well Cave
 Vanguard Cave
 Viney Quarry Cave
 William's Cave
 Wilson's Cave
 Winkies Cave

See also 
 List of caves
 Speleology

References
This article uses freely licensed text from underground-gibraltar.com

External links

List and map of 68 caves of Gibraltar

Gibraltar